Cystatin-M is a protein that in humans is encoded by the CST6 gene.

The cystatin superfamily encompasses proteins that contain multiple cystatin-like sequences. Some of the members are active cysteine protease inhibitors, while others have lost or perhaps never acquired this inhibitory activity. There are three inhibitory families in the superfamily, including the type 1 cystatins (stefins), type 2 cystatins and the kininogens. The type 2 cystatin proteins are a class of cysteine proteinase inhibitors found in a variety of human fluids and secretions, where they appear to provide protective functions. This gene encodes a cystatin from the type 2 family, which is down-regulated in metastatic breast tumor cells as compared to primary tumor cells. Loss of expression is likely associated with the progression of a primary tumor to a metastatic phenotype.

References

External links
 The MEROPS online database for peptidases and their inhibitors: I25.006

Further reading